American on Purpose: The Improbable Adventures of an Unlikely Patriot  is a memoir written by entertainer Craig Ferguson.

The book details various experiences over several decades in Ferguson's life from his days in Scotland through his migration to the United States; the rise of his performing career in the United Kingdom, then Hollywood, and eventual acquisition of US citizenship in early 2008. He tells about his assorted jobs as a musician in a punk rock band, a bouncer, a construction worker, comedian and actor, as well as his struggle with alcoholism and drug abuse, and contemplation of suicide at a low point in his life.

In December 2010 the audiobook version, read by Ferguson, was nominated for a Best Spoken Word Album Grammy.

Promotion 
A few weeks before and after the book went on sale, Ferguson's The Late Late Show featured a recurring segment called "Celebrities Read Excerpts from Craig's Book", with various celebrity guests reading anecdotes from the book in a green-screened library set.

References 

Books about immigration to the United States
Books by Craig Ferguson
Show business memoirs
2009 non-fiction books
HarperCollins books
Memoirs about alcoholism